Scopula subpulchellata is a moth of the  family Geometridae. It is found in China (Hainan).

The wingspan is 22–26 mm.

References

Moths described in 1920
subpulchellata
Moths of Asia